Jeong Yura may refer to:

Jung Yu-ra (鄭由路; born 1992), South Korean handballer
Chung Yoo-ra (鄭維羅; born 1996), South Korean equestrian